Eight freestanding gates called al-Mawazin are located at the top of the staircases leading to the platform (maṣṭaba) of the Dome of the Rock from the surrounding courtyard below. Each gate consists of open arches supported by 2 to 4 columns, set between two pilasters.

One of the reasons mentioned for these doors is that the beauty of the Dome of the Rock should not appear right away, marking a separation between the city and the sacred place.

Names 

They are called  (plural of) because of a belief that scales will hang from these arches to weigh souls on Judgment Day.

They are also simply called  (plural of ), i.e., arcades or arched colonnades.
People also call them  and   – also meaning "arcade".

Dates of construction 
With the exception of the arcades bearing inscriptions which attest that they date back to the Mamluk period, the others probably predate the Crusades, but their dating is difficult. However, it is very likely that some Mawâzim date back to the period of the construction of the Dome of the Rock and that they were an integral part of its initial construction plan. In particular, it is thought that the four arcades facing the four entrances were built at the same time as the dome.

Gallery

References

External links 
 

Religion in Jerusalem
Islam in Jerusalem
Gates